In Connecticut, U.S. Route 202 (US 202) is usually signed as an east–west route. It enters from the New York state line in Danbury overlapped with U.S. Route 6 and ends at the Massachusetts state line in Granby overlapped with Route 10. US 202 is overlapped with other routes for most of its length.

Route description
US 202 enters Connecticut in the town of Danbury duplexed with US 6.  The duplex joins another duplex, I-84 and US 7 at I-84 Exit 4 to form a 3 mile four-way concurrency.  US 7 and 202 split from I-84 and US 6 at Exit 7. They remain duplexed on a freeway for a short stretch before 202 exits the freeway at the first exit (Exit 11) at the Brookfield town line to follow Federal Road, a two-lane road that was an old alignment of US 7. The two roads reunite at the end of the US 7 freeway about  later just before the New Milford town line. Between the junctions of US 7 at Exit 12 and US 7 at the Brookfield-New Milford border, signage for US 202 briefly changes directions to become a north-south route through the center of Brookfield. US 202 returns to being signed in its dominant east-west directions again after overlapping with US 7 in New Milford. The 2 roads split again in the center of New Milford as US 202 turns east to cross the Housatonic River. It then turns northeast to pass through Washington and Morris (briefly), before entering Litchfield.  Route 202 passes through the historic downtown district, where it intersects Route 63 and has a connection with Route 118 which heads toward the western suburbs of Hartford.  It then enters Torrington,  where it meets the Route 8 expressway at Exit 44. Leaving Torrington, US 202 passes through New Hartford before entering Canton. Just after crossing the Farmington River in western Canton, US 202 starts a duplex with US 44 through Canton and the southwest corner of Simsbury into Avon.  In the center of Avon, as US 44 leaves the duplex to the east, US 202 is joined from the east by Route 10, as both turn northward.  US 202 (duplexed with Route 10) then reenters Simsbury, and then enters Granby.  After a brief triplex with Route 189 in the center of town, the US 202/Route 10 duplex crosses the Massachusetts state line into the town of Southwick.  At this point, US 202 officially changes from a signed east-west to a signed north-south route, although signage north of Avon shows both 202 and 10 (the latter correctly so) as signed north-south.

History
US 202 was designated in 1935. It originally went along its modern alignment, continuing east on Lake Avenue and West Street to downtown Danbury, then went south along modern CT 53 and CT 302 into Newtown (this section was signed as CT 34 from 1932 to 1934.) 202 then overlapped with US 6 into Farmington, with CT 10 joining them to the Massachusetts state line. Modern US 202 in Litchfield County was originally part of CT 25 (New Milford to Torrington) and CT 4 (Torrington to Canton.) The portion between Danbury and New Milford was then just US 7. In 1963, CT 4 was shifted southward with CT 25 extended along modern US 202 to Canton. In 1974, US 202 was moved to its modern alignment. CT 25 was truncated to US 7 in Brookfield and the former alignment between Danbury and Newtown became CT 302 and a northern extension of CT 53.

Major intersections

Special designations

In 2010, the Connecticut Department of Transportation designated the  segment of US 202 between the junction with Route 45 and Rabbit Hill Road in New Preston a state scenic road.

References

02-2
 Connecticut
Transportation in Fairfield County, Connecticut
Transportation in Litchfield County, Connecticut
Transportation in Hartford County, Connecticut